Pachyodes subtritus is a moth of the family Geometridae first described by Louis Beethoven Prout in 1914. It is found in China and Taiwan.

Subspecies
Pachyodes subtrita subtrita (Prout, 1914) (Taiwan)
Pachyodes subtrita simplicior (de Joannis, 1929) (China)

References

Pseudoterpnini
Moths described in 1914
Taxa named by Louis Beethoven Prout
Moths of Asia
Moths of Taiwan